Peachgrove Intermediate School is a school in Hamilton, New Zealand, which caters for a diverse range of students, mostly from the Hamilton East/Fairfield community. The roll fluctuates between 500-700 students from year to year.

Aaron West is the principal, supported by Helen Te Kiri, deputy principal, and Davina Parangi-Brown, assistant principal. The school is divided into four mountain group syndicates: Kakepuku, Maungatautari, Pirongia and Karioi, all of which are local maunga (Te Reo/Maori language for 'mountain').

History 
The school was opened to pupils in February 1957. Initially the school was incomplete, with the main hall to be completed and all of the playing fields to be laid. In addition to the usual academic subjects, (English, Maths, Social Studies etc.) the school had fully equipped workshops for home economics (cooking) and woodwork (boys only). 2007 saw Peachgrove celebrate its 50th jubilee, which was well attended by many of the early pupils.

Academic 
Peachgrove provides a diverse programme, including a bi-lingual unit which teaches te reo Maori, Gifted and Talented and standard classrooms. Peachgrove provides specialist technology, music and arts programmes.

The year seven 'Gifted & Talented' class known as "Room5ians" from 2007-2008 used Blogger as a means to extend and enrich their learning. The "Room5ians Rule!" blog is located at http://peachgroveroom5.blogspot.com/.

Sport 
Peachgrove prides itself in having a very strong sporting programme, with teams winning in local competition in rugby, soccer, hockey, and basketball. Students enjoy annual opportunities for international travel to such destinations as Fiji, Rarotonga, New Caledonia, and Japan.

Notable alumni 
 Dame Patsy Reddy, lawyer and Governor-General

References

External links
 Peachgrove Intermediate - Official site

Educational institutions established in 1957
Intermediate schools in New Zealand
Schools in Hamilton, New Zealand
1957 establishments in New Zealand